SS Taormina may refer to:

 , a steamship of  built for Jörgen C. Knudser of Norway; fate unknown
 , an ocean liner of  that sailed for the Italia Line (1908–1912), Lloyd Italiano (1912–1918), and Navigazione Generale Italiana (1918–1929); chartered by the United States in World War I for one troopship voyage; scrapped in Italy in 1929

Ship names